.

Koyal is a small village in the Narwana tehsil of Jind district of Haryana, India. Located on the road between Kalayat and Dhanauri, it is a largely agricultural village, with residents engaged mostly in primary economic activities including animal rearing. It is a politically active village generally find its place in local media. For recreation purposes the game of Kabaddi, Kusti are most favorite apart from latest trend of cricket, badminton. Girls volleyball team achieved all Haryana 1st position in recently concluded School tournament. From cultural perspective being its proximity to Punjab it has influence of Punjabi culture on food habits, work culture, music, dance drama etc. Haryana is known for Swang and Koyal is not untouched to it. Every year in the winter famous troupes visit to the village and that time area gets enthralled in musical jostles.

The village is having many important personalities like Lt Sh. Chandgi Ram Namberdaar who was renowned in nearby areas. Budding political leaders, social workers, sports person are on the anvil. Recently a Gaushala has been constructed with active participation of all people of village. Persons are deputed to collect money and food stuff actively. There is a Yuva sanghtan in this village and its name is Sahid Bhagat Singh Yuva Sanghtan. Ruldu ram Punia is now President of this sanghtan.

Boys from village has gone ahead with their studies and few got lucrative govt jobs as well. Sh Rajender Punia, joint director of general in Competition Commission of India is gem among them. Others are like Surender Punia (Assistant Commissioner), Baljeet Punia (Deputy District Education Officer), Yashpal Punia (Ministry of Home Affairs), Darvesh Punia(businessman/philanthropist/politician),
Few problems in village are like -

(1) Drinking water has been becoming a serious challenge as the ground water is getting contaminated with arsenal are other problematic substances.

(2) Degrading agriculture land and unsustainable agri practices are leaving behind decreasing output. It is causing mental stress and farmers are sometime forced to take extreme steps.

(3) Unemployment is at the peak and this is leading to some other problems like family problems and addiction among youth to liquor, drugs etc.

Etymology

The name Koyal is derived its name from the cuckoo, which used to be abundant in the locality during historical periods.

Facilities

The village has a middle school, veterinary clinic, anganwadi, patwarkhana, Temple of Lord Shiva, other religious and social places such as Dada Khera, Peer, various Choupals. Large playground for children is another icon of the village.

Demography 

As per census 2011 the total population of the village is 3343 (1786 males and 1557 females) with sex ratio of 871/1000 only. The village consists of general, OBC and SC population. Hindu is the main religion apart from Islam and Sikh. People are living in harmony and the name of the village is complemented with its residents' activities of cooperation and mutual respect. Agricultural activities demand labor and the village's population do not provide sufficient workers at the peak time of sowing and harvesting. With the advancement in the technology and availability of credit from the banks now people are getting access to new farm implements. Event though there is a constant shortage of labor which is managed with the migrated labor force from UP, Bihar, Chhattisgarh, Jharkhand, etc. The migration pattern of the village is quite interesting. Educated youth is being attracted to the employment oriented urban centers. Many of them aspire to fly to a foreign country especially Canada, USA, Australia, New Zealand, UK, UAE, etc. This is one of the sought after professions and if one gets settled in one country then a chain reaction of followers will be quite visible. In this course many of the youth have been fleeced by travel agents and others, who then illegally entered into a foreign country and were now languishing in prison.

Villages in Jind district